I.T. is a 2016 thriller film directed by John Moore and written by Dan Kay and William Wisher. It stars Pierce Brosnan, James Frecheville, Anna Friel, Stefanie Scott, and Michael Nyqvist and was produced by David T. Friendly and Beau St. Clair, who was Brosnan's producing partner at the production company Irish DreamTime before her death. The film was released in theaters and via video on demand in the United States on September 23, 2016, by RLJ Entertainment.

Plot
Mike Regan is a self-made aviation tycoon who lives in a state-of-the-art smart house full of modern technology with his wife Rose and 17-year-old daughter Kaitlyn. Mike's company is developing an app called "Omni Jet" which will increase business while the company raises much-needed financial capital with a stock offering. However, it requires U.S. Securities and Exchange Commission (SEC) approval.

At the company, Mike meets Ed Porter, a 28-year-old information technology (I.T.) consultant and calls him to fix his home's Wi-Fi signal, which his daughter complains is slow. The password is revealed here to be "ReganHouse1" which lacks Password strength, an indicator of Regan's lack of security.  Porter also upgrades the Global Positioning System (GPS) in Mike's car and claims that he also worked at the National Security Agency (NSA) and had taken part in a military exercise in Kandahar.

Porter meets Kaitlyn and starts a relationship with her through social media, but Mike fires him after Kaitlyn invites Porter into the house; this ends his promising career at the company. Devastated, Porter begins to remotely access Mike's private data and his house as he covertly monitors them through the security cameras and devices all over the smart house. He also spies on Kaitlyn and secretly records her masturbating in the shower.

Porter sends fake emails to Mike's clients and the SEC, threatening the company's survival. He also takes full control of the house's technology, which leaves the family terrified. He uses a spoof email to send Rose fake mammogram results, saying that she tested positive for breast cancer. Rose is extremely distressed, but her test results were actually negative according to her attending physician. After Mike becomes aware that Porter has done this, he attacks Porter and threatens to kill him if he does not stay away from his family.

Porter then uploads the video of Kaitlyn masturbating online, immediately catching the attention of her schoolmates; she is mortified and blames her father for installing the technology in their house. Angered, Mike drives to see Porter but he is also being monitored by Porter, who mockingly telephones him through the car navigation system and sends him the video. Porter then remotely deactivates the car's brake system, hitting a nearby stalled truck and destroying the car.

Mike requests help from Henrik, an I.T. expert, who says that Mike must destroy all the smart technology in the house and delete his emails, bank accounts and computer files. Henrik explains that Porter's real name is Richard Edward Portman and that his father committed suicide when Porter was six years old. He also reveals that he never worked for the NSA, as he claimed, and the photograph of him with soldiers in Kandahar was fake. To allow Mike to obtain evidence from Porter's apartment, Henrik creates a diversion by stealing the phone of a waitress at a coffee shop with whom Porter's obsessed and texting Porter, telling him to come to the coffee shop. While Porter is gone, Mike manages to get in his apartment and steal several thumb drives containing evidence, escaping just as Porter returns to his apartment after realising it was a diversion. Porter realises the masked man that he saw in his apartment was Mike, so he frames him for assault, prompting the police to arrest Mike when trying to provide the evidence from the thumb drives to the police.

After being released, Mike returns home to find Kaitlyn and Rose tied and gagged by Porter, who holds them at gunpoint. Shortly afterwards a struggle ensues; Porter shoots a window and Mike punches Porter, who hits his head and lies dying as Mike holds the gun to his chest, but Rose begs Mike not to kill him.

Some time later, the company's employees applaud Mike and his family for successfully developing the app and their house is restored.

Cast
 Pierce Brosnan as Mike Regan
 James Frecheville as Ed Porter
 Anna Friel as Rose Regan
 Stefanie Scott as Kaitlyn Regan
 Michael Nyqvist as Henrik
 Adam Fergus as Sullivan
 Jason Barry as Patrick
 Clare-Hope Ashitey as Joan
 Eric Kofi-Abrefa as Detective Kayden
 Brian Mulvey as George
 Austin Swift as Lance

Production
The film was first announced in October 2013 as a revenge thriller with Pierce Brosnan headlining the project. It was set to be financed by Voltage Pictures and directed by Stefano Sollima. In August 2014, it was revealed that John Moore had replaced Sollima as the film's director, and commissioned a complete rewrite of the script by William Wisher. Stefanie Scott was cast in April 2015 as the daughter of Brosnan's character, and that the film was to start shooting in June later that year, in Ireland. A month later (in May), it was reported that Anna Friel had joined the cast as the wife of Brosnan's character and that James Frecheville would play the young antagonist. Michael Nyqvist joined the project a few days later. It is the last film produced by Beau St. Clair before she died from cancer. Principal photography began on June 25, 2015, and concluded on July 29, 2015.

Release
I.T. was first released theatrically in Bulgaria and Romania on September 9, 2016. RLJ Entertainment released the film in theaters and via video on demand in the United States on September 23, 2016. The theatrical trailer for the film debuted in August 2016.

Reception
I.T. received negative reviews from critics. On the review aggregator website Rotten Tomatoes, the film has an approval rating of 9% based on 43 reviews and an average rating of 3.4 out of 10. On Metacritic, the film has a score of 27 out of 100 based on 9 reviews, indicating "generally unfavorable reviews." Joe Leydon of Variety criticized the cliched screenplay, but gave praise to Brosnan's performance and the direction. The Guardian gave the film two out of five stars, calling it 'blundering'. The New York Times found little to recommend, criticizing the screenplay and execution.

References

External links
 
 
 

2016 films
2016 thriller films
American thriller films
English-language Danish films
Danish thriller films
Films about computing
Films directed by John Moore
Films set in Washington, D.C.
Films shot in Ireland
English-language French films
French thriller films
English-language Irish films
Irish thriller films
Techno-thriller films
Voltage Pictures films
2010s English-language films
2010s American films
2010s French films